Harlow Stadium is a greyhound racing track located in Harlow, Essex, England. The stadium also has executive suites, a restaurant, a number of bars and conference and banqueting facilities.

Racing takes place in the evening on Monday and Wednesday, and in the morning on Friday, Saturday and Sunday.

Opening 

Harlow Stadium opened on Wednesday 15 March 1995. The site chosen for racing was an area north east of the town known as the Pinnacles just off the Roydon Road and directly west of the football stadium. Access to the track is on Stadium Way past the Scimitar industrial park. Toni Nicholls bought the land from receivers when the new football stadium was being built in 1993 and constructed the new facilities including executive suites, a restaurant and conference and banqueting facilities. In addition a large car park was constructed. The first ever trial session, in preparation for the opening was held in October 1994.

History
The first Racing Manager was former trainer Stan Gudgin who was replaced by Mark Schellenberg after Gudgins retirement. In 2005 Nicholls's company Leaside Leisure Ltd came to an agreement with Barclay Entertainment to sell the track. The new stadium owner was Dave Barclay joint-owner of a successful building contractors business in the Essex area. Despite offers from developers Barclay continues to invest into the track and has achieved some notable successes for Harlow Greyhound Stadium.

Following the closure of Walthamstow Stadium in 2008 Chris Page arrived as General Manager with five trainers; John Coleman, Mark Wallis, Mick Puzey, Graham Sharp and Kelly Mullins. Mark Wallis brought the ultimate prize to the track after winning the 2009 English Greyhound Derby with Kinda Ready. Harlow was rewarded with a first Sky Sports televised meeting in 2011 and Barclay brought in Greyhound Sales in 2013.

In 2018 the stadium signed a deal with SIS to race every Monday and Wednesday evening and every Friday and Sunday morning.

Track records

Current records

Former

References

External links
 Official site

Greyhound racing venues in the United Kingdom
Sports venues in Essex
Harlow
1995 establishments in England
Sports venues completed in 1995